Volleyball events were contested at the 1959 Central American and Caribbean Games in Caracas, Venezuela.

References

1959 Central American and Caribbean Games
1959
1959 in volleyball
International volleyball competitions hosted by Venezuela